Kathy Jordan and Elizabeth Smylie were the defending champions, but none competed this year. Smylie opted to focus on the singles tournament.

Gigi Fernández and Martina Navratilova won the title by defeating Marcella Mesker and Pascale Paradis 6–4, 6–0 in the final.

Seeds

Draw

Finals

Top half

Bottom half

References

External links
 Official results archive (ITF)
 Official results archive (WTA)

1985 Virginia Slims World Championship Series